Life is a breakfast cereal produced by the Quaker Oats Company. Introduced in 1961, the cereal has a brown, checked square pattern and mainly consists of oat flour, corn flour, added  sugar, and whole-wheat flour. , with the advent of numerous specialty varieties, the original cereal is now marketed as "Life Original Multigrain Cereal".

Ingredients 
Life contains whole grain oat flour, corn flour, sugar, whole wheat flour, calcium carbonate, salt, baking soda, tocopherols (preservatives), and a mixture of B vitamins. It formerly contained the preservative BHT, but was later removed in 2021.

Advertising 
When the cereal was first introduced in the 1960s, the original slogan was "The most useful protein ever in a ready-to-eat cereal". The original mascots (in commercials narrated by Paul Frees) were munchkin-like characters.

Life was popularized during the 1970s by an advertising campaign featuring "Little Mikey", a hard-to-please four-year-old boy portrayed by John Gilchrist. The commercials featured the slogan "He likes it! Hey, Mikey!" said in surprise after his brothers see Mikey actually enjoying the cereal.

The ad campaign was created by ad firm Doyle Dane and Bernbach. The campaign ran from 1972 to 1986, becoming one of the longest-running television advertisements in history. As recently as 1999, the commercial was included in a list of "memorable ads". A subsequent commercial repeated the scenario with the same dialog, but used lumberjacks instead of children.

Varieties 

In 1978, "Cinnamon Life," developed by Ed Heaton, was introduced followed shortly thereafter by "Raisin Life". Today, Cinnamon Life accounts for one-third of total Life sales. Raisin Life sold poorly and was discontinued in the mid-1980s.

In 2002, a version called "Baked Apple Life" was released. "Honey Graham Life" was introduced in early 2004, "Life Vanilla Yogurt Crunch" in late 2005, and "Life Chocolate Oat Crunch", in 2006. All three were discontinued by 2008.

In 2008, Quaker introduced "Maple & Brown Sugar Life". In the fall of 2016, "Vanilla Life" cereal was released. As of March 2023 there are four varieties of Life cereal: Cinnamon, Vanilla, Chocolate, and Original.

Original Life has been reformulated several times since its introduction.

References

External links 

 

Quaker Oats Company cereals
Products introduced in 1961